6 Equulei is a probable (95% chance) astrometric binary star system in the northern constellation of Equuleus, located 380 light years from the Sun. It is barely visible to the naked eye as a dim, white-hued star with an apparent visual magnitude of 6.07. The system is moving further away from the Earth with a heliocentric radial velocity of +6.9 km/s. It forms a wide optical double with γ Equulei, at an angular separation of 336 arcseconds in 2011.

The visible component is an Ap star with a stellar classification of A2Vs, matching the evolutionary state of an A-type main sequence star while displaying "sharp" absorption lines. It is an estimated 970 million years old with a projected rotational velocity of 65 km/s. The star has 2.6 times the mass of the Sun and around 1.7 times the Sun's radius. It is radiating 71 times the luminosity of the Sun from its photosphere at an effective temperature of 9,078 K.

References

External links 
 frostydrew.org/stars.dc/star/id-126597/pss-obsy
 www.wolframalpha.com/input/?i=6+Equulei

A-type main-sequence stars
Ap stars
Equuleus
Durchmusterung objects
Equulei, 06
201616
104538
8098